Quercus sideroxyla, called the Santa Rosa oak and encino colorado, is a species of oak native to northern and southwestern Mexico. It is placed in section Lobatae.

References

sideroxyla
Endemic oaks of Mexico
Flora of the Sierra Madre Occidental
Flora of the Sierra Madre Oriental
Flora of the Sierra Madre del Sur
Flora of the Trans-Mexican Volcanic Belt
Plants described in 1809
Taxa named by Aimé Bonpland